Emily S. Gurley is an American epidemiologist. She is a professor of the practice in the department of epidemiology at the Johns Hopkins Bloomberg School of Public Health.

Education 
Gurley completed a BA at Oglethorpe University in 1996 and a MPH from Emory University in 2002. She earned a PhD from Johns Hopkins Bloomberg School of Public Health in 2012.

Career and research 
Gurley began conducting public health research at the ICDDR, B in 2003 where she remained for 12 years. She worked with the Centers for Disease Control and Prevention and the Government of Bangladesh to create a surveillance program for meningoencephalitis, respiratory tract infection, gastroenteritis, and hospital-acquired infection. Gurley also lead the surveillance and outbreak investigation unit and was the director of the emerging infections program. Beginning in 2004, she researched the ecology and epidemiology of nipah virus infections. She works in transmission, disease burden, and epidemiology of diseases preventable by vaccines. Gurley uses the One Health framework to research infectious disease prevention and the ecology of human diseases.

Gurley is an associate scientist in the department of epidemiology in the department of epidemiology at Johns Hopkins Bloomberg School of Public Health. She has a joint affiliation in the global disease epidemiology and control division in the department of international health.

References

External links 

 

Living people
Year of birth missing (living people)
Place of birth missing (living people)
American women epidemiologists
American epidemiologists
Oglethorpe University alumni
Emory University alumni
Johns Hopkins Bloomberg School of Public Health alumni
Johns Hopkins Bloomberg School of Public Health faculty
21st-century American women scientists
Public health researchers
Women medical researchers
American medical researchers